Lanškroun is a town in Ústí nad Orlicí District in the Pardubice Region of the Czech Republic. It has about 9,300 inhabitants. It lies on the border of the historical lands of Bohemia and Moravia. The historic town centre is well preserved and is protected by law as an urban monument zone.

Administrative parts
Lanškroun is made up of town parts of Dolní Třešňovec, Lanškroun-Vnitřní Město, Ostrovské Předměstí and Žichlínské Předměstí.

Geography
It lies in the Podorlická Uplands.

The Třešňovský Stream flows through the town. In the northwestern part of the municipal territory is a set of six ponds on the Ostrovský Stream. The largest of them is Dlouhý, used for recreational purposes and water sports. The northernmost ponds Pšeničkův and Olšový and the area around the Zadní Stream before its confluence with Ostrovský Stream are protected as a nature reserve within the Lanškroun Ponds Nature Park.

History

The first written mention of Lanškroun is from 1285, when it was donated by King Wenceslaus II to Zavis of Falkenstein. Lanškroun was founded during the colonization in the second half of the 13th century under the name Landeskrone. It became the economical centre of the large estate of Lanšperk and later of separate Lanškroun estate.

In 1304, Lanškroun property of the Zbraslav Monastery and in 1358, it was acquired by Roman Catholic Diocese of Leitomischl. In 1371, an Augustinian monastery was founded. In 1421, the town was conquered by Jan Žižka. After the Hussite Wars, the estate was acquired by the noble family of Kostka of Postupice. It began to prosper and obtained various privileges. In 1507, it was bought by the Pernštejn family. Then it was shortly held by Hrzán of Harasov, and after the Battle of White Mountain, it was bought by the Liechtenstein family.

During the Thirty Years' War, the town was repeatedly burned down and looted by Swedish army and the catholicization began. After the war, the population was significantly decreased. It was repopulated by German settlers and in 1683, German has become the official language.

During the 18th century, Lanškroun was an average serf town. In 1848, the serfdom was abolished and Lanškroun became a district town. In the 1870s, the industrialization began. The railway was built in 1884–1885.

Until 1918, the town was part of the Austrian monarchy (the Austrian side after the Austro-Hungarian Compromise of 1867), as the seat of the district Landskron in Bömen, one of the 94 Bezirkshauptmannschaften in Bohemia.  After 1919 it became part of Czechoslovakia. In 1938 it was occupied by German troops as the Protectorate of Bohemia and Moravia, according to the Munich Agreement.

Until the expulsion of the German speaking population from Lanškroun in 1946, the majority of population of the town had been German. After the expulsion, the town became completely Czech. In 1945, it ceased to be a district town.

Demographics

Sights

Lanškroun is known for its large Renaissance town hall, which is one of the symbols of the town. It was built in 1581–1582. The two original Renaissance portals are preserved.

The original monastery from the 14th century was rebuilt into a Renaissance castle. The reconstruction was completed in 1601. From the 1650s to 1716, it was rebuilt to its current appearance. Today it houses the town museum. The Church of Saint Wenceslaus is adjacent to the castle and stood here before the founding of the monastery. It was first mentioned in 1350 and originally was consecrated to the Virgin Mary. It was reconstructed several times, the tower was added in 1768.

Notable people
Jan Marek Marci (1595–1667), physician and scientist
Josef Johann Steinmann (1779–1833), Austrian pharmacist and chemist
Friedrich Gustav Piffl (1864–1932), Cardinal and Archbishop of Vienna
Herwig Schopper (born 1924), Czech-German experimental physicist
Jan Smejkal (born 1946), chess player
Jan Ambrož (born 1954), chess player
Ludmila Müllerová (born 1954), politician
Robert Dušek (born 1967), politician
Roman Šebrle (born 1974), decathlete, Olympic winner

Twin towns – sister cities

Lanškroun is twinned with:
 Castiglione in Teverina, Italy
 Dzierżoniów, Poland
 Hajdúszoboszló, Hungary
 Kežmarok, Slovakia
 Serock, Poland

References

External links

 

Cities and towns in the Czech Republic
Populated places in Ústí nad Orlicí District
Populated places established in the 13th century